The United States Penitentiary, Coleman I and II (USP Coleman I and II) are high-security United States federal prisons for male inmates in Florida. It is part of the Coleman Federal Correctional Complex (FCC Coleman) and is operated by the Federal Bureau of Prisons, a division of the United States Department of Justice.  USP Coleman I was opened in 2001, and in 2004 Clark Construction completed a  additional component for USP Coleman II.

Former prisoner Nate A. Lindell wrote that USP Coleman II is "a so-called special-needs prison—a 'safe' facility where informants, former cops, ex-gang members, check-ins (prisoners who intentionally put themselves in solitary confinement to be safe), homosexuals, and sex offenders can all, supposedly, walk the Yard freely. At regular BOP lockups, these types of men are in danger of being beaten, stabbed, or killed." The Marshall Project stated that "Coleman II did not respond to multiple requests for confirmation".

Correction Officer Michael Rudkin
In late 2008, Michael Rudkin was sentenced to 10 years in prison for having sex with a female inmate and plotting with her to kill his wife while he was a correctional officer at the Federal Correctional Institution, Danbury, a federal prison for women in Connecticut. Rudkin was sent to FCC Coleman to serve his sentence. While at Coleman, Rudkin solicited the help of fellow inmates in June 2009 to find a hitman to kill his ex-wife, her new boyfriend, his former inmate paramour and a federal investigator. He provided a handwritten note giving physical descriptions and locations of the intended victims to fellow inmates. The inmates alerted authorities, who instructed the inmates to provide Rudkin with a false name and address of a "hitman." Rudkin subsequently mailed money from his inmate account to the alleged "hitman" as an advance. Rudkin was subsequently convicted of orchestrating the plot and sentenced to 90 years in prison, which he served at the United States Penitentiary, Terre Haute, the federal facility in Indiana. On August 24, 2021 he was beaten to death by another inmate.

Notable inmates (current and former)
†The Sentencing Reform Act of 1984 eliminated parole for most federal inmates. However, inmates sentenced for offenses committed prior to 1987 are eligible for parole consideration.

Infamous prisoners

Financial crimes

Terrorists

Organized crime figures

Others

See also

List of United States federal prisons
Federal Bureau of Prisons
Incarceration in the United States

References

External links
USP Coleman I at the Federal Bureau of Prisons (Official site)
Clark Construction on Coleman II at the Clark Construction website.
History of Coleman I at the Prisoner Resource website.

Buildings and structures in Sumter County, Florida
Coleman
Coleman